Denis Conway (1722–1796) was an Irish Roman Catholic prelate who served as the Bishop of Limerick from 1779 to 1796.

Biography
Denis Conway studied at the Irish College in Louvain and was ordained a priest 22 September 1753. He became bishop of Limerick in 1779 receiving consecration by Archbishop James Butler 2nd and died in 1796.

References 

1813 deaths
18th-century Roman Catholic bishops in Ireland
Roman Catholic bishops of Limerick